Khushboo (born 24 June 1969 in Lahore, Pakistan) is a Pakistani film and stage-actress and dancer. Her first film was Maa bani Dulhan, in 1988.

Career
She started her career in 1988 as supporting heroine after that she acted in many movies, usually in a supporting heroine role. Her most successful movie was Dil kisi ka dost nahi (1997) in which she played the lead role, however after having failed to garner much fame, she turned to stage shows in 2000. She married a fellow co actor Arbaaz Khan. She also works on stage and theater.

Filmography

List of stage performances 
 Jiddon Luk Nu
 Doom
 Wey Gujjara Wey
 Tera Ishq NachaYea
 Puck Gyan Umbian
 Eik Wari Te Senay
 Juppi Kutkay
 Payar Di Gunderi
 Tich Butona The Jori
 Meri Pholan Wali Kurti
 Kuchi Kali Hoon
 KayRee KayRee Shea Teri
 Tauba Tauba Kara Diti
 Bilo Ni Tera Laal Ghagra
 Juppi Kutkay
 Punjabi Munde Lain Chuske
 Seeti Bajay Ge
 Jor braber ka

References

1969 births
Living people
Pakistani film actresses
Actresses from Lahore
Pakistani female dancers
Pakistani stage actresses
20th-century Pakistani actresses
21st-century Pakistani actresses